The 2010 Torneo Descentralizado de Fútbol Profesional (known as the 2010 Copa Cable Mágico for sponsorship reasons) was the ninety-fourth season of Association Peruvian football. A total of 16 teams competed in the tournament, with Universitario de Deportes as the defending champion. The season began on February and concluded on December 12 with the victory of Universidad San Martín over León de Huánuco in the second leg of the final Play-off, giving Universidad San Martín its third Peruvian title.

Competition modus
The season was divided into 3 stages. In the first stage the 16 teams played a round-robin home-and-away round for a total of 30 matches each. In the second stage the 16 teams were divided into 2 groups. The 8 teams that ranked an odd number played in the group Liguilla A and the 8 teams that ranked an even number played in Liguilla B. In addition, the team ranked first at the end of the first stage is eligible to play the 2011 Copa Libertadores as Peru 3. Each team carried on their records from the first stage. Both groups played another round-robin home-and-away round for 14 matches played by each team. Bonus points were awarded to two teams based on the performance of their reserve teams in the 2010 Torneo de Promoción y Reserva before the first match of the second stage. The teams ranked first in each group at the end of the 14 matches advanced to the third stage. The two teams with the fewest points at the end of the second stage were relegated. In the third stage the championship was contested in a two-legged Play-off. The Play-off finalists qualified for the Copa Libertadores. The remaining international competition berths were determined by the season aggregate table.

Changes from 2009
First stage winner is guaranteed a berth in the first stage of the Copa Libertadores if they finish the season above 9th place on the aggregate table. If they advance to the third stage of the Torneo Descentralizado, they can choose whether to enter the Copa Libertadores in the First stage or Group stage.
A team can field 4 foreign players and can sign up to 6 foreign players on their squad.
A separate tournament called Torneo de Promocion y Reserva will be played with reserve players of the 16 teams and the winner of this tournament will award their first division team 2 points and the runner-up will award 1 point to their respective first division team. The points will be added to the senior teams after the Second stage groups have been formed.
At the end of the second stage, if two teams tie for first place in their group, a match will be played at a neutral venue to determine the winner of the group.

Teams
Sport Áncash and Coronel Bolognesi finished the 2009 season in 15th and 16th place, respectively, in the aggregate table and thus were relegated to the Segunda División. They were replaced by the champion of the 2009 Segunda División, Sport Boys and the champion of the 2009 Copa Perú, León de Huánuco.

First stage

Results

Second stage
The Second Stage began September. The winner of each Liguilla will qualify for the 2011 Copa Libertadores Second Stage.

Liguilla A

Standings

Results

Liguilla B

Standings

Results

Third stage
The Third Stage will be the finals (also known as the Play-off) of the 2010 season between the winners of each group of the Second Stage. They will be played in December. The group winner with the most points on the aggregate table chooses which leg they will play as the home team. They will also choose the venue of the third match in case both teams are tied on points after the second leg.

Aggregate table
The aggregate table will determine the three teams who qualify to the 2011 Copa Sudamericana, and the two teams to be relegated to the Segunda División. The aggregate table consists of the points earned in the First and Second stages.

Top goalscorers

See also
 2010 Torneo de Promoción y Reserva

Footnotes

A.  Alianza Atlético's regular venue is undergoing renovations.

References

External links
Soccerway.com
Peruvian Football League News 

2010
1